In geometry, the alternated hypercube honeycomb (or demicubic honeycomb) is a dimensional infinite series of honeycombs, based on the hypercube honeycomb with an alternation operation. It is given a Schläfli symbol h{4,3...3,4} representing the regular form with half the vertices removed and containing the symmetry of Coxeter group  for n ≥ 4. A lower symmetry form  can be created by removing another mirror on an order-4 peak.

The alternated hypercube facets become demihypercubes, and the deleted vertices create new orthoplex facets. The vertex figure for honeycombs of this family are rectified orthoplexes.

These are also named as hδn for an (n-1)-dimensional honeycomb.

References 

 Coxeter, H.S.M. Regular Polytopes, (3rd edition, 1973), Dover edition, 
 pp. 122–123, 1973. (The lattice of hypercubes γn form the cubic honeycombs, δn+1)
 pp. 154–156: Partial truncation or alternation, represented by h prefix: h{4,4}={4,4}; h{4,3,4}={31,1,4}, h{4,3,3,4}={3,3,4,3}
 p. 296, Table II: Regular honeycombs, δn+1
 Kaleidoscopes: Selected Writings of H. S. M. Coxeter, editied by F. Arthur Sherk, Peter McMullen, Anthony C. Thompson, Asia Ivic Weiss, Wiley-Interscience Publication, 1995,  
 (Paper 24) H.S.M. Coxeter, Regular and Semi-Regular Polytopes III, [Math. Zeit. 200 (1988) 3-45]

Honeycombs (geometry)
Polytopes